Byron Browne may refer to:
 Byron Browne (baseball) (born 1942), American baseball outfielder
 Byron Browne (artist) (1907–1961), American painter

See also
 Byron Brown (disambiguation)